The 2003 World Fencing Championships were held in Havana, Cuba. The event took place from October 5 to October 11, 2003.

Medal summary

Men's events

Women's events

Medal table

References
FIE Results

World Fencing Championships
W
Fencing Championships
21st century in Havana
International fencing competitions hosted by Cuba
Sports competitions in Havana
October 2003 sports events in North America